"Harvester of Sorrow" is a song by the American heavy metal band Metallica. It was released on August 28, 1988, as the first single from their fourth studio album, ...And Justice for All (1988). The song debuted at a live performance prior to the release of ...And Justice for All while the band was on the summer Monsters of Rock Tour in 1988 with Van Halen, Scorpions, Dokken and Kingdom Come.

The single contained two B-sides, both of which were cover songs: "Breadfan", originally by Budgie, and "The Prince", originally by Diamond Head. There was an error in the mastering of the recording: At the end of "Breadfan", a distorted voice can be heard saying "Mommy, where's Fluffy?". This was actually intended to be the intro to the next track, "The Prince". However, it was separated in the wrong place. The band decided not to correct this error when the tracks were included on their 1998 Garage Inc. compilation.

Content
The song's subject matter refers to a man who descends into madness, taking out his anger on his family. At the end of the song, it is hinted his sanity snaps and he murders them.

Cover versions
The song was covered by San Francisco–area punk rock band Link 80 for the 2000 compilation album Punk Goes Metal. Apocalyptica covered the song for the A Tribute to the Four Horsemen cover album. German electronic group Funker Vogt also covered the song on The Blackest Album Vol. 3 tribute album.

Personnel
Metallica
 James Hetfield – rhythm guitar, vocals
 Kirk Hammett – lead guitar
 Lars Ulrich – drums
 Jason Newsted – bass

Release history

Chart positions

References

1988 singles
Metallica songs
Songs written by James Hetfield
Songs written by Lars Ulrich
1988 songs
Elektra Records singles